Park Su-bin (born February 12, 1994), better known as Subin or Dalsooobin, is a South Korean singer, songwriter and television host. She made her debut in 2011 as a member of the South Korean girl group Dal Shabet. She made her solo debut in 2016.

Early life and education
Park was born on February 12, 1994, in Gwangju.  She is currently majoring in Theatre at Konkuk University.

Career

2011–15: Career beginnings
Park made her debut through the release of Supa Dupa Diva with Dal Shabet on January 3, 2011. Promotions for "Supa Dupa Diva" began on January 6, 2011, on Mnet's M! Countdown.

Along with her fellow Dal Shabet members, Park made a cameo in the hit KBS' series Dream High as a student of Kirin High School. Park and Dal Shabet also later appeared in the movie Wonderful Radio as the fictional girl group "Corby Girls". She joined the cast of Koreana Jones on March 28, 2011, and participated in eight episodes. Along with fellow Dal Shabet member Serri, Park participated in the OST for the OCN series God's Quiz 2.  The track, titled Turn Your Head, was released on June 23, 2011. She was a co-MC on KBS2's TV program Poker Face Season 2, which premiered on July 13, 2011.  The show ran until September 7, 2011, and had ten episodes.

In 2012, Park became a temporary MC for eight episodes of SBS MTV's Studio C with Mighty Mouth. She later joined the cast of MBC's Music Storage with Yang Hee-eun, Horan, and ZE:A's Junyoung.  The show ran for ten episodes from October 13, 2012, to December 1, 2012.

Park became the host of the MBC program Music Talk Talk Ma Bling in January 2013. The show ran for 117 episodes, with the final episode airing on July 12, 2013.  During the program's run, Park was cast in the seven-episode tvN mini-series Find the Fake. On December 25, 2013, Park made a cameo appearance in the SBS' series My Love from the Star.

Park composed and co-wrote the song Just Pass By with BtoB's Jung Il-hoon.  The track is Park's first solo and was included on Dal Shabet's seventh EP, B.B.B, which was released on January 8, 2014.

On May 2, 2014, Park became a cast member of the second season of MBC Every 1's 9 to 6, a program which involved celebrities seeking employment in jobs outside of the entertainment industry.  The broadcast of the program experienced multiple interruptions and delays due to the Sewol tragedy and Park being involved in a car accident.

Park produced Dal Shabet's eighth EP, Joker is Alive, which was released on April 15, 2015, also contributing as co-writer for all tracks.

2016–present: Solo debut
Park debuted as a soloist with the single album Flower in May 2016, featuring the tracks "Hate" and "Flower". Both songs were written and produced by herself. She followed this up with the release of her first EP, Our Love, on June 20.

Park lent her vocals to all four songs released as part of the soundtrack for variety show "I Am a Movie Director, Too" where she was also a cast member on the show.

On December 28, 2016 she released another digital single Moon, Pt. 1, consisting of two tracks, "Swing" and "Moon". Following the release, Park release her second EP, Circle's Dream, on February 23, 2017. The EP contains four tracks, including double title track "Circle's Dream" and "Strawberry", along with "Swing" and "Moon", which previously release as a part of the digital single Moon, Pt. 1.

In December 2017, Park's contract with Happy Face Entertainment expired and she subsequently left the label. Her future with Dal Shabet remains in discussion.

In February 2018, it was reported that she had signed a contract with KeyEast. She release the digital single "Katchup" as her new stage name Dalsooobin.

On July 26, 2022, it was announced that Dal Soobin will be making a comeback with the single "Hookah", which she wrote, arranged and produced by Dal Soobin. The track will be released on July 28.

Discography

Extended plays

 Our Love (2016)
 Circle's Dream (2017)

Singles

Soundtrack appearances

Filmography

Film

Television series

Television show

Web shows

Awards and nominations

References

External links 

 
 

1994 births
Living people
South Korean female idols
South Korean women pop singers
South Korean singer-songwriters
Dal Shabet members
Konkuk University alumni
Hanlim Multi Art School alumni
South Korean women singer-songwriters